St Werburgh's Church, Bristol, is a former church, now a climbing centre in the St Werburghs area of central north-east Bristol, England. It has been designated on the National Heritage List for England as a Grade II* listed building.

The area became known as St Werburghs when the church was relocated from Corn Street to Mina Road in 1879.

History
The original church of St Werburgh, of medieval origin, stood in Corn Street in Bristol. It has been suggested that the dedication to an Anglo-Saxon princess, St Werburgh, could give the church a pre-Conquest foundation. It was rebuilt by James Bridges in 1758.

The parish it served was quite small and the building caused the road to narrow, and larger horse-drawn carriages were causing congestion. An act of parliament was obtained enabling the closure of the church, with the last service being held on 12 August 1877. During the removal of the church 100 coffins and 40 chests of human remains were uncovered. These were reburied at Greenbank Cemetery. The original site was bought by the West of England and South Wales Bank and became a branch of Lloyds Bank.

Parts of the original building, particularly the tower, were re-used in the construction of the new church under the direction of the architect John Bevan. It was reconsecrated at the new site with the first service being held on 30 September 1879. The church held its last service on Remembrance Sunday in 1988, after which it was de-consecrated and converted into Bristol's first indoor climbing centre called Undercover Rock.

The climbing centre includes top-rope climbs, bolted lead climbs, and a bouldering area,  all using hardboard walls built inside the original church structure. There is also a small cafe and viewing area. In 2016 Undercover Rock was taken over by another Bristol climbing centre The Climbing Academy.

Architecture

The church is built of ashlar limestone in a Perpendicular Gothic Revival style, with an aisled nave and chancel, west porch and south-west tower. The five-stage tower has an octagonal stair turret.

Archives
Parish records for St Werburgh's church, Bristol are held at Bristol Archives (Ref. P. St W) (online catalogue) including baptism and marriage registers and a burial register. The archive also includes records of the incumbent, churchwardens, parochial church council, charities, societies and vestry plus deeds.

See also

 Churches in Bristol
 Grade II* listed buildings in Bristol

References

Former churches in Bristol
Bristol, Church of St John the Baptist
Redundant churches